SIPS 1259-4336 is a red dwarf star first documented in 2005, in the constellation Centaurus. It is located around 25 light-years from Earth.

History of observations
Discovery of SIPS 1259-4336 was published in 2005 by Deacon et al. The star was detected by its high proper motion from the Southern Infrared Proper Motion Survey (SIPS).

The star was originally incorrectly thought to be 11.8 light-years from Earth. However, two later sets of observations found it to be at just over 25 light-years, and one of these - the Gaia spacecraft observation - has a much smaller margin of error.

Distance
Later distance estimates of the star, besides trigonometric parallax with high uncertainty from the star's discovery paper,() include a parallax of "~128 mas" without specific error range from Burgasser et al. (2015). Its cross-references, including for parallax, were the 2005 discovery paper and T. Henry, priv. comm.

Variability
The brightness of the star shows a dimming trend, with period in excess of ten years.

References

Notes

Centaurus (constellation)
M-type main-sequence stars
J12590470-4336243
Astronomical objects discovered in 2005